Kiandra "KiKi" Layne (born December 10, 1991) is an American actress. She is best known for her starring roles in such films as the romantic drama If Beale Street Could Talk (2018), the drama Native Son (2019), the action superhero film The Old Guard (2020), and the romantic comedy Coming 2 America (2021).

Early life
Layne is from Cincinnati, Ohio. She earned a BFA in acting from The Theatre School at DePaul University in 2014.

In a 2018 interview with Vanity Fair, Layne said that she was always acting growing up and that her favorite movie as a child was The Lion King. She said, "I used to watch it every day and create these extravagant stories with my Barbies and stuffed animals."

Career
Layne's first acting role was with Lena Waithe in the pilot for the drama series The Chi, filmed in 2015.

She has modeled for the fashion brand Kate Spade New York.

Layne's breakout role was in Barry Jenkins' 2018 drama If Beale Street Could Talk. She starred in the 2019 screen adaptation of Richard Wright’s 1940 novel Native Son, then alongside Charlize Theron in 2020's The Old Guard, directed by Gina Prince-Bythewood.

Layne was featured in composer Max Richter's Voices, which was inspired by the Universal Declaration of Human Rights. The album contains readings of the Declaration by Eleanor Roosevelt and Layne, with a further 70 readings by people around the world.

In 2021, Layne joined the cast alongside Eddie Murphy in the Amazon Prime sequel Coming 2 America.

Layne stars as Detective Ellie Steckler in Chip 'n Dale: Rescue Rangers.

Personal life
Layne is currently in a relationship with Ari'el Stachel, whom she met on the set of Don't Worry Darling in the fall of 2020.

Filmography

Awards and nominations

References

External links 
 

1991 births
Living people
21st-century American actresses
Actresses from Cincinnati
African-American actresses
American film actresses
21st-century African-American women
21st-century African-American people